Arthur Larouche (July 1, 1900 – July 10, 1968) was a politician Quebec, Canada and a Member of the Legislative Assembly of Quebec (MLA).

Early life

He was born on July 1, 1900, in Chicoutimi, Saguenay-Lac-Saint-Jean.

Town politics

Larouche served as a city councillor in Rivière-du-Moulin from 1932 to 1936.

Member of the legislature

He ran as an Action libérale nationale candidate in the district of Chicoutimi in the 1935 provincial election and won. Larouche joined Maurice Duplessis's Union Nationale and was re-elected in the 1936 election. He resigned his seat and left provincial politics on April 13, 1938. He was succeeded by Antonio Talbot.

Mayor

Larouche was the Mayor of Rivière-du-Moulin from 1952 to 1958.

Death

He died on July 10, 1968.

References

1900 births
1968 deaths
Action libérale nationale MNAs
Mayors of places in Quebec
Politicians from Saguenay, Quebec
Union Nationale (Quebec) MNAs